Usingerella is a genus of plant bugs in the family Miridae. There are at least two described species in Usingerella.

Species
These two species belong to the genus Usingerella:
 Usingerella bakeri (Knight, 1943)
 Usingerella simplex (Reuter, 1909)

References

Further reading

 
 
 

Miridae genera
Articles created by Qbugbot
Dicyphini